Finland was represented by Laila Kinnunen, with the song "Valoa ikkunassa", at the 1961 Eurovision Song Contest, which took place on 18 March in Cannes, France. Finland was one of three countries (along with Spain and Yugoslavia) making their Eurovision debut in 1961 and "Valoa ikkunassa" was chosen as the first Finnish entry at the national final organised by broadcaster Yle and held on 12 February.

Before Eurovision

National final
The final was held at the Työväenopisto in Helsinki, hosted by Aarno Walli. Four songs took part, having qualified from a radio-only semi-final. The winning song was chosen by an "expert" jury.

Songs eliminated in the semi final

At Eurovision 
On the night of the final Laila Kinnunen performed 4th in the running order, following Austria and preceding Yugoslavia. At the close of voting "Valoa ikkunassa" had received 6 points (2 from Italy and the United Kingdom and 1 from Denmark and France), placing Finland joint 10th (with Monaco and the Netherlands) of the 16 entries. The Finnish jury awarded its highest marks (3) to Luxembourg and Monaco.

Voting 
Every country had a jury of ten people. Every jury member could give one point to his or her favourite song.

References 

1961
Countries in the Eurovision Song Contest 1961
Eurovision
Eurovision